Wesley Hicks was a Negro league outfielder in the 1920s.

Hicks made his Negro leagues debut in 1927 with the Memphis Red Sox. He went on to play for Memphis again in 1928, his final professional season.

References

External links
 and Baseball-Reference Black Baseball stats and Seamheads

Place of birth missing
Place of death missing
Year of birth missing
Year of death missing
Memphis Red Sox players
Baseball outfielders